Rear Admiral John Moresby (15 March 1830 – 12 July 1922) was a British naval officer who explored the coast of New Guinea and was the first European to discover the site of Port Moresby.

Life and career
Moresby was born in Allerford, Somerset, England, the son of Eliza Louisa and Admiral of the Fleet Sir Fairfax Moresby. He joined the navy at an early age as a Volunteer 1st Class in HMS Victor, and rose to be in charge of the 1,031 ton paddle steamer cruiser HMS Basilisk in which he made hydrological surveys around eastern New Guinea. During the survey of the southern coast he discovered the harbour which he named Fairfax after his father. The town established there, based on already existing native villages (principally Hanuabada) was named Port Moresby and is now the nation's capital.

John Moresby was also searching for a shorter route between Australia and China and on the eastern tip of the island he discovered the China Strait. He continued exploring along the north west coast as far as the Huon Gulf.

He was later promoted to rear admiral and died on 12 July 1922 in Fareham, Hampshire, England.

Family
In 1859 he married Jane Willis Scott (? – 1876) of Queenstown, Ireland and had six children:
 Walter Halliday Moresby CBE (9 November 1861 – 24 April 1951), lawyer and spy
 Elizabeth Louisa Moresby (1862 – 3 January 1931), became a well-known writer under a variety of pseudonyms, married Edward Western Hodgkinson and Ralph Coker Adams Beck
 Harry Drake Hodgkinson
 Ethel Fortescue Moresby (1865 – ?), married Frederick Haines
 Georgina Moresby (23 July 1867 - 1953?), married Peyton Temple Mackeson (1854–1918)
 Donald Fairfax Mackeson
 Hilda Fairfax Moresby (16 December 1868 – 16 August 1893), accidentally drowned
 Gladys Moresby (5 April 1870 - ?)

During the 1890s he lived on Tower Street in Chichester.

Works
New Guinea and Polynesia..., John Moresby, John Murray 1876 (reprinted 2002, Elibron Classics)
Two Admirals, Admiral of the Fleet, Sir Fairfax Moresby (1786–1877), and His Son, John Moresby. A Record of Life and Service in the British Navy for a Hundred Years, John Moresby, Murray, London 1909

Notes and references

External links
 

1830 births
1922 deaths
People from West Somerset (district)
English explorers
English explorers of the Pacific
History of Papua New Guinea
Royal Navy rear admirals
Port Moresby
Military personnel from Somerset